Evi Eva (1899–1985) was a German film actress.

Selected filmography
 The Eyes as the Accuser (1920)
 The Secrets of Berlin (1921)
 At the Edge of the Great City (1922)
 Hallig Hooge (1923)
 The Heart of Lilian Thorland (1924)
 Mister Radio (1924)
 The Hobgoblin (1924)
 Gobseck (1924)
 The King and the Girl (1925)
 Athletes (1925)
 The Morals of the Alley (1925)
 The Salesgirl from the Fashion Store (1925)
 The Marriage Swindler (1925)
 The Last Horse Carriage in Berlin (1926)
 The Great Duchess (1926)
 Annemarie and Her Cavalryman (1926)
 The Violet Eater (1926)
 I Liked Kissing Women (1926)
 The Orlov (1927)
 The Lady with the Tiger Skin (1927)
 The Prince's Child (1927)
 Forbidden Love (1927)
 Immorality (1928)
 Today I Was With Frieda (1928)
 Only a Viennese Woman Kisses Like That (1928)
 Dawn (1929)
 We Stick Together Through Thick and Thin (1929)
 The Merry Wives of Vienna (1931)
 Shooting Festival in Schilda (1931)
 Urlaub auf Ehrenwort (1938)

References

Bibliography
 Goble, Alan. The Complete Index to Literary Sources in Film. Walter de Gruyter, 1999.

External links

1899 births
1985 deaths
German film actresses
German silent film actresses
Actresses from Berlin
20th-century German actresses